Cwm Prysor Viaduct, which is occasionally referred to as Blaen-y-Cwm Viaduct, is a railway viaduct which crosses the Afon Prysor in thinly populated uplands east of Trawsfynydd, Gwynedd, Wales. It was built by the Bala and Festiniog Railway. The line it was built for went out of service in 1961.

History
The structure consists of nine stone arches carrying a single bi-directional track over which passenger trains ran from 1882 to 1960, with freight trains lasting until 1961. The viaduct was the most substantial single structure on the line. It is sharply curved, necessitating the provision of a check rail in its active railway days.

In 1953 extensive repair work was undertaken in which the opportunity was taken to raise the parapet and add metal railings on top.

A "Last Train" special crossed the viaduct a week before final closure. The track was lifted in the 1960s.

The prospect of rail traffic returning over the viaduct is very remote, not least because part of the route has been flooded by the construction of a dam at Llyn Celyn.

The viaduct is the location of a spectacular suicide in episode 8 of the 2018 S4C drama Hidden (Craith).

Modern access
The structure is Grade II Listed. In 2015 the public had a Permissive Right of Access to the viaduct, but no right of way. It is included in widely publicised walks.

Gallery

References

Sources

Further material

External links
 The line LJT2 with mileages Railway Codes
 Reminiscences by a local railwayman Forgotten Relics
 1960 Working timetable 2D53
 Special train on the viaduct NW Rail

Railway bridges in Wales
Rail transport in Gwynedd
Llanycil
Former railway bridges in the United Kingdom